Dysoptus asymmetrus is a species of moth in the family Arrhenophanidae. It is known only from the type locality in southern Venezuela, but it almost certainly will be found elsewhere in the lowland Amazon rainforest.

Adults are on wing in early February (based on two records).

Etymology
The specific name is derived from the Greek asymmetros (without symmetry), in reference to the asymmetrical valvae of the male genitalia.

External links
Family Arrhenophanidae

asymmetrus
asymmetrus
Moths described in 2003
Endemic fauna of Venezuela
Moths of South America